Cleveland Township is one of eighteen townships in Callaway County, Missouri, USA.  As of the 2010 census, its population was 742.

History
Cleveland Township was created sometime between 1883 and 1897 from the northern sector Bourbon Township as previously defined, and named after President Grover Cleveland.
As can be seen from the 1930 map of Callaway townships, at some point after 1930 the southeastern corner of Cleveland Township reverted to become part of Bourbon Township again. Its boundaries are illustrated in the maps linked below.

Geography
Its western boundary is Cedar Creek, with Boone County beyond it. The township contains four cemeteries: Allen, Oak, Simpson and Youngers, and the stream of Manacle Creek runs through this township.

References

 USGS Geographic Names Information System (GNIS)

External links
 US-Counties.com
 City-Data.com
 (Map of Callaway County in 1930, on the last photocopied page of this atlas):  http://cdm16795.contentdm.oclc.org/cdm/ref/collection/moplatbooks/id/656
 (Map of Callaway County in 1876, prior to the creation of Cleveland Township, on 2nd page of this atlas:   
 http://digital.shsmo.org/cdm/ref/collection/plat/id/6022

Townships in Callaway County, Missouri
Jefferson City metropolitan area
Townships in Missouri